Dilacinia is a genus of moths of the family Crambidae. It contains only one species, Dilacinia badialis, which was described from Persia.

References

Odontiinae
Taxa named by Hans Georg Amsel
Monotypic moth genera
Crambidae genera